The Negros Occidental Private Schools Sports Cultural Educational Association (NOPSSCEA) is a voluntary association of private institutions in Negros Occidental, Philippines that organizes athletic, cultural, and educational programs of many private high schools, colleges, and universities. Its headquarters is located in Panaad Park.

The association's founding schools include Colegio San Agustin-Bacolod, University of St. La Salle, University of Negros Occidental - Recoletos, STI West Negros University, St. John's Institute and Riverside College. At present NOPSSCEA has 54 member-schools in the province.

See also
National Collegiate Athletic Association (Philippines)

External links
NOPSSCEA Official Website
List of NOPSSCEA member schools

References

Student sport in the Philippines
1980 establishments in the Philippines
Organizations established in 1980
Sports in Negros Occidental